Phalonidia lacistovalva is a species of moth of the family Tortricidae. It is found in Loja Province, Ecuador.

The wingspan is about 15 mm. The ground colour of the forewings is whitish grey, suffused and spotted with brownish grey except for the postmedian area along the distal edge of the median fascia where it is suffused with white. The hindwings are whitish, spotted and tinged with pale brownish grey on the periphery.

References

Moths described in 2002
Phalonidia